Puerto Rico competed at the 1964 Summer Olympics in Tokyo, Japan. 32 competitors, 30 men and 2 women, took part in 29 events in 8 sports. The Games were hosted from 11 to 24 October.

Athletics

Men's Pole Vault
Rolando Cruz
Men's Swimming
Eliot Chenaux

Basketball

Boxing

Diving

Sailing

Shooting

Three shooters represented Puerto Rico in 1964.

25 m pistol
 Leon Lyon

50 m pistol
 Fred Guillermety

Trap
 Jaime Loyola

Swimming

Weightlifting

References

External links
Official Olympic Reports

Nations at the 1964 Summer Olympics
1964
1964 in Puerto Rican sports